The Last Camel Died at Noon is the sixth in a series of historical mystery novels, written by Elizabeth Peters and featuring fictional sleuth and archaeologist Amelia Peabody.  Although most of the Amelia Peabody series are fairly "hardboiled" historical detective stories, Last Camel is an exception and satirizes adventure novels in the tradition of Henry Rider Haggard. The title of this book is identical to the first sentence of the 1981 thriller The Key to Rebecca by Ken Follett. The Last Camel Died at Noon most closely follows the tradition with plot elements like a lost and ancient civilization, a young English girl serving as its high priestess, an evil prince, a wronged noble prince who wants to free the slaves, kidnappings, escapes, mazes of tunnels (and palaces) hand-carved from cliffs.

Plot summary
A relatively quiet evening at home in 1897 for the Emersons is disturbed by the appearance of Reggie Forthright and his grandfather, Viscount Blacktower. The two visitors have information about Blacktower's older son, Willoughby Forth, who disappeared fourteen years ago in the desert west of the Nile in the Sudan. They tell the story of a lost civilization in the midst of the desert. Lord Blacktower's story would have been discounted, except the map he produced was on the back of a page from Emerson's own notebook, drawn by Willie Forth himself.  Blacktower wants the Emersons to lead an expedition to find the missing heir, but the Emersons decline.

Surprisingly, Radcliffe, Amelia, and Ramses do travel to the Sudan, to excavate at Gebel Barkal and Napata, the first Nubian capital. The sudden appearance of Reggie Forthright causes them to alter their plans. Reggie is set on seeking his long-lost uncle, and when he disappears in the western wastes, the Emersons have no recourse but to go after him.

But the rescuers need rescue themselves when all but one of their men desert them, and their camels die off one by one. Finally, the last faithful servant takes a chance and looks for a promised oasis ahead. Nearly dead from heat and thirst, they suddenly find themselves in a world 3,000 years out of place.

Amelia suffers the worst of it, taking weeks to fully recover. She is spurred on because they find themselves in a place where ancient Egypt is still alive and functioning. And they find that their servant was in fact one of two brothers struggling for power in the ancient land.

They soon learn that anyone who thought life in ancient Egypt was simple would have been grossly mistaken. The intrigues, politics, and social mores push and prod the Emersons in ways they never expected, and they still need to discover what happened to Willie Forth, his wife, and his nephew.

Dinner with princes and a queen, clandestine meetings with priestesses, and plans to escape all jumble together until the god Aminreh appears to make his decision, and all three Emersons are in the midst of the action when Aminreh makes the choice no one expected...

Nefret Forth is introduced, and the source of her later wealth is established.  So too is the devotion the family has to a young woman they did not know the existence of just a short while before.

Awards
The novel was nominated for an Agatha Award in the "Best Novel" category in 1992.

See also

 List of characters in the Amelia Peabody series

References

1991 novels
Amelia Peabody
Fiction set in 1897
Novels set in Sudan